Family Rules may refer to:
 Family Rules (American TV series), a 1999 television sitcom
 Family Rules (Australian TV series), a 2017 observational documentary television series